Gypsy Folk Tales is an album by drummer Art Blakey and the Jazz Messengers recorded in 1977 and released on the Roulette label.

Reception

Allmusic awarded the album 2½ stars stating "This Roulette LP includes six fairly recent originals in addition to a pair of numbers co-written by drummer Art Blakey with saxophonist Bob Mintzer. Davis's "Gypsy Folk Tales" and "Jodi" are the best-known songs and the hard-bop oriented solos are consistently fresh".

Track listing 
All compositions by Walter Davis, Jr. except as indicated
 "Jodi" - 10:15   
 "Cami" - 6:55   
 "Miwako" (Art Blakey, Bob Mintzer) - 4:27   
 "Gypsy Folk Tales" - 7:36   
 "Time Will Tell" (Bobby Watson) - 6:58   
 "Ronnie's a Dynamite Lady" - 7:54   
 "Hawkman" (Watson) - 10:30   
 "Malibu" (Blakey, Mintzer) - 4:42

Personnel 
Art Blakey - drums
Valery Ponomarev - trumpet
Bobby Watson - alto saxophone
David Schnitter - tenor saxophone
Walter Davis, Jr. - piano
Dennis Irwin - bass

References 

Art Blakey albums
The Jazz Messengers albums
1977 albums
Roulette Records albums